The Budapest Quartet was a string quartet established in Budapest in 1886 by Jenő Hubay and David Popper.

Johannes Brahms performed with the quartet and thought it was the best he had heard.

This quartet went under a variety of names. Outside Hungary, it was usually called "Quartet Hubay-Popper". Within Hungary it was called "Hungarian Quartet" or "Budapest Quartet". This was because Hungarians were fiercely patriotic.

They performed for twenty-seven years.

Composition
The quartet's initial composition was:

 Jenő Hubay, first violin
 Viktor Herzfeld, second violin
 Bram Eldering, viola
 David Popper, cello

Herzfeld played in 1886-1889 and 1897-1899. Wilhelm Grünfeld (concertmaster of Budapest Opera) played in 1888 the 2nd violin and 1889  (later a teacher at the Music Academy). After then, two students of Hubay played the 2nd violin: in 1894 János Farkas and from 1895 Rudolf Kemény. Elderling left the quartet soon. Violist from 1888 was Josef Waldbauer and from 1898 Gustav Szerémi.

Notes

References
 
 

Musical groups established in 1886
Hungarian string quartets
1886 establishments in Hungary